Kalpataru Das (7 February 1948 – 25 July 2015)  was an Indian politician from the Odisha state. He belonged to the Biju Janata Dal (BJD) party. He won the Odisha Legislative Assembly election, 1995 from Dharmasala constituency of Jajpur district, which he held consecutively from 1995-2014.
On 2 August 2012, he was given the portfolio of Panchayati Raj Minister. From 3 April 2014, he was an MP of Rajya Sabha. In 2013, he was State Panchayati Raj Minister and Parliamentary Affairs Minister. He died on 25 July 2015, aged 67. He was cremated on Sunday evening at Bhotaka in Tehsil Kuakhia, Jajpur district, from where he belonged, by his eldest son BJD MLA Pranab Balabantaray.

References

1950 births
2015 deaths
Biju Janata Dal politicians
Rajya Sabha members from Odisha
Members of the Odisha Legislative Assembly
State cabinet ministers of Odisha